The teams competing in Group 3 of the 2015 UEFA European Under-21 Championships qualifying competition were Netherlands, Scotland, Slovakia, Georgia and Luxembourg.

The ten group winners and the four best second-placed teams advanced to the play-offs.

Standings

Results and fixtures
All times are CEST (UTC+02:00) during summer and CET (UTC+01:00) during winter.

Goalscorers
 7 goals
  Quincy Promes

 6 goals
  Luc Castaignos

 4 goals

  Ivan Schranz
  Adam Zreľák

 3 goals
  Ondrej Duda

 2 goals

  Giorgi Chanturia
  Jambul Jigauri
  Valeri Kazaishvili
  Tonny Vilhena
  Hakim Ziyech
  Tomáš Malec
  Ryan Gauld
  Stevie May
  Lewis Macleod

 1 goal

  Mamuka Kobakhidze
  Davit Skhirtladze
  Antonio Luisi
  Clenn Borges
  Jean-Paul Boëtius
  Jesper Drost
  Karim Rekik
  Marco van Ginkel
  Mike van der Hoorn
  Stuart Armstrong
  Ryan Fraser
  Callum Paterson
  Lewis Toshney
  Jamie Walker
  Tony Watt
  Patrik Hrošovský
  Michal Janec
  Karol Mészáros 
  Jakub Paur
  Lukáš Pauschek
  Michal Škvarka

References

External links
Standings and fixtures at UEFA.com

Group 3